The Hungarian National Time Trial Championships are organized annually by the Hungarian Cycling Federation to decide the champions in the time trial discipline, across various categories.

Multiple Winners

Men

Women

Men

Elite

U23

Women

See also
Hungarian National Road Race Championships

References

National road cycling championships
Cycle races in Hungary
Road